Conus flavescens, common name the flame cone, is a species of sea snail, a marine gastropod mollusk in the family Conidae, the cone snails and their allies.

There is one subspecies: Conus flavescens caribbaeus Clench, 1942 (synonyms: Conus caribbaeus Clench, 1942, Gradiconus flavescens caribbaeus (Clench, 1942),  Tuckericonus caribbaeus (Clench, 1942), Tuckericonus flavescens caribbaeus (Clench, 1942))

Like all species within the genus Conus, these snails are predatory and venomous. They are capable of "stinging" humans, therefore live ones should be handled carefully or not at all.

Distribution
Locus typicus: "Sowerby (1858) gave South Australia as the type locality which is incorrect.
Clench (1942) suggested that "the original specimens may have come from the Bahamas". 
This area is here selected Locus typicus."

This marine species occurs in the Caribbean Sea and the Gulf of Mexico off Florida, USA, the Greater Antilles and off the Bahamas.

Description 
The maximum recorded shell length is 25 mm. The smooth shell is grooved towards the base. Its color is yellowish, variegated with large irregular white blotches, arranged mostly just below the shoulder angle, and below the middle of the body whorl, so as to form two interrupted bands.

Habitat 
Minimum recorded depth is 0 m. Maximum recorded depth is 122 m.

References

 David K. Camp, William G. Lyons, and Thomas H. Perkins: Checklists of Selected Shallow-Water Marine Invertebrates of Florida; Florida Marine Research Institute, FMRI Technical Report TR-3, ISSN 1092-194X
  Petit, R. E. (2009). George Brettingham Sowerby, I, II & III: their conchological publications and molluscan taxa. Zootaxa. 2189: 1–218
  Puillandre N., Duda T.F., Meyer C., Olivera B.M. & Bouchet P. (2015). One, four or 100 genera? A new classification of the cone snails. Journal of Molluscan Studies. 81: 1–23

External links
 The Conus Biodiversity website
 Cone Shells – Knights of the Sea

Gallery
Below are several color forms:

flavescens
Gastropods described in 1834
Taxa named by George Brettingham Sowerby I